Mark Weyland was Governor of the Bank of England from 1789 to 1791. He had been Deputy Governor from 1787 to 1789. He replaced Edward Darell as Governor and was succeeded by Samuel Bosanquet.

See also
Chief Cashier of the Bank of England

References

External links

Governors of the Bank of England
Year of birth missing
Year of death missing
British bankers
Deputy Governors of the Bank of England